Helichus striatus is a species of long-toed water beetle in the family Dryopidae. It is found on debris and under rocks in cool streams from South Carolina to Quebec, and west to California and British Columbia.

Subspecies
These two subspecies belong to the species Helichus striatus:
 Helichus striatus foveatus LeConte, 1852 i c g
 Helichus striatus striatus LeConte, 1852 i c g
Data sources: i = ITIS, c = Catalogue of Life, g = GBIF, b = Bugguide.net

References

Further reading

 

Dryopidae
Articles created by Qbugbot
Beetles described in 1852